Jane Catharine Tost (1817-1889) was an Australian taxidermist.

She was employed stuffing and mounting specimens for the Royal Society of Tasmania at the Hobart Town Museum in 1856-60, and had the same position at the Australian Museum in Sydney in 1864-69. This position was unusual for her gender and she was a pioneer as such. From 1872 onward, she managed the Tost & Coates Berlin Wool Depot and Taxidermists in Sydney with her daughter Ada Jane Rohu (1848-1928), and from 1860, mother and daughter participated in international exhibitions and won many prizes.

References
 Australian Dictionary of Biography

1817 births
1889 deaths
19th-century Australian artists
19th-century Australian businesspeople
Taxidermists
19th-century Australian women artists